Pedra do Indaiá is a Brazilian municipality located in the center of the state of Minas Gerais. Its population as of 2020 was 3,974 people living in a total area of 349 km². The city belongs to the meso-region of Oeste de Minas and to the micro-region of Formiga.  It became a municipality in 1962.

Origin of the name
The origin lies in the legend of an image of Jesus left near a stone (pedra) and later ""discovered"".  A chapel was built in stone and soon people began to build their houses nearby.  The settlement grew and was first called Senhor Bom Jesus da Pedra do Indaiá.  In 1923 it became Pedra do Indaiá. In 1962 it separated from Itapecerica and became a municipality.

Location
The city center of Pedra do Indaiá is located at an elevation of 693 meters approximately halfway between Formiga and Divinópolis.  It is just north of state highway MG-050, which connects Belo Horizonte to Passos.  Neighboring  municipalities are:  Santo Antônio do Monte (N), São Sebastião do Oeste (E),  Itapecerica (S),  and Formiga (W).

Distances to other cities
Connection with BR-050: 6 km
Belo Horizonte/MG - 173 km
Formiga/MG - 46 km
Divinópolis/MG - 40 km
Santo Antônio do Monte/MG - 24 km

Economic activities
Services, small industry, and agriculture are the most important economic activities.  In 2005 there were 9 extractive industries (quarries) and 13 transformation industries.  Transformation industries employed 340 workers.  The GDP in 2005 was approximately R$29 million, 3 million reais from taxes, 11 million reais from services, 9 million reais from industry, and 5 million reais from agriculture.  There were 463 rural producers on 19,000 hectares of land (2006).  33 farms had tractors (2006).  Approximately 1,100 persons were involved in agriculture.  The main crops are rice, beans, and corn.  There were 11,000 head of cattle (2006).

There were no banks (2007).  The motor vehicle fleet had 482 automobiles, 51 trucks, 45 pickup trucks, and 223 motorcycles (2007).

Health and education
In the health sector there were 6 public health clinics, one of which was specialized.  Patients with more serious health conditions are transported to Formiga or Divinópolis.  Educational needs of 750 students were met by 4 primary schools, 1 middle school, and 1 pre-primary school.

Municipal Human Development Index: 0.755 (2000)
State ranking: 249 out of 853 municipalities as of 2000
National ranking: 1729 out of 5,138 municipalities as of 2000
Literacy rate: 83%
Life expectancy: 74 (average of males and females)

In 2000 the per capita monthly income of R$183.00 was well below the state and national average of R$276.00 and R$297.00 respectively.  Poços de Caldas had the highest per capita monthly income in 2000 with R$435.00.  The lowest was Setubinha with R$73.00.

The highest ranking municipality in Minas Gerais in 2000 was Poços de Caldas with 0.841, while the lowest was Setubinha with 0.568.  Nationally the highest was São Caetano do Sul in São Paulo with 0.919, while the lowest was Setubinha.  In more recent statistics (considering 5,507 municipalities) Manari in the state of Pernambuco has the lowest rating in the country—0,467—putting it in last place.

References

See also
 List of municipalities in Minas Gerais

Municipalities in Minas Gerais